Mauno Nikolai Jussila (15 August 1908 – 3 November 1988) was a Finnish farmer and politician, born in Vahto. He served as deputy minister of finance from 3 March 1956 to 27 May 1957 and from 29 August 1958 to 13 January 1958, as deputy minister of social affairs from 14 August 1961 to 13 April 1962, as deputy minister of finance from 13 April 1962 to 13 December 1963 and as minister of finance from 13 December to 18 December 1963. He was a member of the Parliament of Finland from 1951 to 1970, representing the Agrarian League, which renamed itself the Centre Party in 1965.

References

1908 births
1988 deaths
People from Rusko
People from Turku and Pori Province (Grand Duchy of Finland)
Centre Party (Finland) politicians
Government ministers of Finland
Members of the Parliament of Finland (1951–54)
Members of the Parliament of Finland (1954–58)
Members of the Parliament of Finland (1958–62)
Members of the Parliament of Finland (1962–66)
Members of the Parliament of Finland (1966–70)
Place of death missing